Mikhaylov is a town and the administrative center of Mikhaylovsky District in Ryazan Oblast, Russia, located on the Pronya River (Oka's tributary),  southwest of Ryazan, the administrative center of the oblast. Population:

History
It was first mentioned in 1546 among other fortified towns in the periphery of the Grand Duchy of Moscow. It was inhabited by the Streltsy, cannonmakers, and carpenters, who formed slobodas around the town. In 1618, Mikhaylov withstood a ten-day siege by the Polish army. In 1708, the town became a part of Moscow Governorate and then of Ryazan Vice-Royalty and Ryazan Governorate.

Administrative and municipal status
Within the framework of administrative divisions, Mikhaylov serves as the administrative center of Mikhaylovsky District. As an administrative division, it is, together with six rural localities, incorporated within Mikhaylovsky District as the town of district significance of Mikhaylov. As a municipal division, the town of district significance of Mikhaylov is incorporated within Mikhaylovsky Municipal District as Mikhaylovskoye Urban Settlement.

References

Notes

Sources

Cities and towns in Ryazan Oblast
Mikhaylovsky Uyezd